The 1942 Cornell Big Red football team was an American football team that represented Cornell University as an independent during the 1942 college football season. In its seventh season under head coach Carl Snavely, the team compiled a 3–5–1 record and was outscored 148-95 by its opponents. The team captain was Roy Johnson. 

Cornell played its home games at Schoellkopf Field in Ithaca, New York.

Schedule

References

Cornell
Cornell Big Red football seasons
Cornell Big Red football